Blagoy Makendzhiev (born 11 July 1988) is a Bulgarian professional footballer who plays as a goalkeeper for FC Krumovgrad.

Career

Makendzhiev began his professional career at Pirin Blagoevgrad. He made his competitive debut on 9 November 2005 in a match against Lokomotiv Sofia. In the next two seasons he played in only 4 games. During the 2009-10 season, he gradually established himself as the first choice goalkeeper for Pirin.

In December 2010, Makendzhiev signed a 3-year contract with CSKA Sofia. On 18 May 2011 he made his official debut for CSKA in a home draw 2–2 against his former club Pirin Blagoevgrad. In 2011-12 season he spend most of the time on the bench, earning only one league appearance, coming as a substitute when Raïs M'Bolhi received a red card in away win 0–2 against Litex Lovech. After the managerial departure of Stoycho Mladenov from CSKA, Miodrag Ješić was appointed as head coach. Blagoy was not part of the plans of the new manager. In January 2013 he was released by the club.

In June 2013, Makendzhiev joined Beroe Stara Zagora as a free agent. He quickly established as first choice goalkeeper, having initially served as an understudy to Ivan Karadzhov.

In February 2017, Makendzhiev joined his hometown club Pirin Blagoevgrad. He immediately established himself as a first choice goalkeeper, contributing to Pirin's improved performances and results.  However, at the end of the yеar his contract was terminated by mutual consent.

On 18 December 2017, Makendzhiev signed with Cherno More. On 17 February 2018, he made his debut in a 1–4 home defeat by Beroe.

International career
On 27 January 2015, Makendzhiev received his first call-up to the Bulgaria national team for the Friendly game against Romania on 7 February 2015 in Antalya from Ivaylo Petev. He played over the course of the entire second half, keeping a clean sheet in the non-official friendly match that ended with a score of 0:0. He was named as part of Bulgaria's 2016 Kirin Cup squad.

Career statistics
As of 14 December 2018

References

External links
 Player Profile at Soccerway
 

1988 births
Living people
People from Petrich
Bulgarian footballers
First Professional Football League (Bulgaria) players
PFC Pirin Blagoevgrad players
PFC CSKA Sofia players
PFC Beroe Stara Zagora players
PFC Cherno More Varna players
FC Dunav Ruse players
FC Montana players
FC Krumovgrad players
Association football goalkeepers
Sportspeople from Blagoevgrad Province
21st-century Bulgarian people